Sead Seferović (born 28 April 1970) is a retired Bosnian footballer who last played for Željezničar in the Bosnian Premier League.

Club career
During his professional career he spent four seasons in Croatia's Prva HNL and also played in Switzerland and Mexico with  Tigres UANL during the 1995-96 season. He retired from professional football in 2003, after receiving a one-year suspension for doping in 2002. Following his retirement from professional football, he took on various managerial roles with his hometown club Iskra Bugojno.

He played with FK Mogren in the 1991–92 Yugoslav Second League, and first half of the 1992–93 First League of FR Yugoslavia.

International career
Seferović made his debut for Bosnia and Herzegovina in a January 2001 Sahara Millennium Cup match against Bangladesh and has earned a total of 8 caps (3 unofficial), scoring 1 goal. His final international was an August 2001 LG Cup match against Iran.

International goals
Scores and results list Bosnia and Herzegovina's goal tally first.

References

External links

1970 births
Living people
People from Bugojno
Association football midfielders
Yugoslav footballers
Bosnia and Herzegovina footballers
Bosnia and Herzegovina international footballers
NK Iskra Bugojno players
FK Mogren players
NK Pazinka players
Neuchâtel Xamax FCS players
HNK Hajduk Split players
Tigres UANL footballers
HNK Rijeka players
FK Željezničar Sarajevo players
Yugoslav Second League players
First League of Serbia and Montenegro players
Croatian Football League players
Swiss Super League players
Liga MX players
Premier League of Bosnia and Herzegovina players
Bosnia and Herzegovina expatriate footballers
Expatriate footballers in Serbia and Montenegro
Bosnia and Herzegovina expatriate sportspeople in Serbia and Montenegro
Expatriate footballers in Croatia
Bosnia and Herzegovina expatriate sportspeople in Croatia
Expatriate footballers in Switzerland
Bosnia and Herzegovina expatriate sportspeople in Switzerland
Expatriate footballers in Mexico
Bosnia and Herzegovina expatriate sportspeople in Mexico
Bosnia and Herzegovina football managers
NK Iskra Bugojno managers